Restricted open-shell Hartree–Fock (ROHF) is a variant of Hartree–Fock method  for open shell molecules. It uses doubly occupied molecular orbitals as far as possible and then singly occupied orbitals for the unpaired electrons. This is the simple picture for open shell molecules but it is difficult to implement.
The foundations of the ROHF method were first formulated by Clemens C. J. Roothaan in a celebrated paper  and then extended by various authors, see e.g. for in-depth discussions.

As with restricted Hartree–Fock theory for closed shell molecules, it leads to Roothaan equations written in the form of a generalized eigenvalue problem

Unlike restricted Hartree–Fock theory for closed shell molecules, the form of the Fock matrix is not unique. Different so-called canonicalisations can be used leading to different orbitals and different orbital energies, but the same total wavefunction, total energy, and other observables.

In contrast to unrestricted Hartree–Fock (UHF), the ROHF wave function is a satisfactory eigenfunction of the total spin operator -  (i.e. no Spin contamination).

Developing post-Hartree–Fock methods based on a ROHF wave function is inherently more difficult than using a UHF wave function,  due to the lack of a unique set of molecular
orbitals.
However, different choices of reference orbitals have shown to provide similar results, and thus many different post-Hartree–Fock methods have been implemented in a variety of electronic structure packages.
Many (but not all) of these post-Hartree–Fock methods are completely  invariant with respect to orbital choice (assuming that no orbitals are "frozen" and
thus  not correlated).
The ZAPT2 version of Møller–Plesset perturbation theory specifies the choice of orbitals.

References 

Electronic structure methods